The flag of Almería was adopted in 1997 with a smooth red cross and a white back. The cross of Saint George was adopted after the Reconquista by the Reyes Católicos in 1489.

References

External links

Almería
History of Almería
Flags displaying animals
Flags introduced in 1997